Lauridromia is a genus of crabs in the family Dromiidae. It contains only two species. At one time a third species, Lauridromia indica, was included in the genus but that has now been transferred to the genus Dromidiopsis as Dromidiopsis indica (Gray, 1831).

Characteristics
Crabs in this genus have a carapace that is about as long as it is wide, with well-developed rostral and anterolateral teeth. The carapace has a covering of coarse hairs and some shaggy bristles near the margins. The chelipeds bear epipods (small lateral extension from the base). The pereopods (walking legs) are smooth. The fourth pereopod has a propodus (penultimate segment) with spines on its inner and outer margins and a larger spine opposing the dactylus (tip segment), which is spineless. The fifth pereopod is shorter than the third and has a propodus with one or two spines opposing the dactylus and three further spines on its outer margin. The dactylus on this leg has one spine or is unarmed. The uropods are visible externally. On the female the sternal grooves are separate and set on large tubes behind the chelipeds. The abdomen is locked in place on the underside of the animal by serrated flanges on the second and third pereopods bonding with the margin of the abdomen. There is a visible suture between the fifth and sixth somites (segments) of the abdomen.

Species
The World Register of Marine Species includes:
Lauridromia dehaani  (Rathbun, 1923)
Lauridromia intermedia  (Laurie, 1906)

References

Dromiacea